The 2012 Ford EcoBoost 400 was a NASCAR Sprint Cup Series stock car race held on  November 18, 2012 at Homestead Miami Speedway in Homestead, Florida. Contested over 267 laps, it was the thirty-sixth in the 2012 NASCAR Sprint Cup Series, as well as the final race in the ten-race Chase for the Sprint Cup, which ends the season. Jeff Gordon of Hendrick Motorsports won the race, his second win of the season and Hendrick's first win at Homestead Miami (and their 10th win of the season), while Clint Bowyer finished second and Ryan Newman finished third.

The race was notable for three lasts: the last race for Dodge in the foreseeable future, the last race with the fifth-generation Sprint Cup car body, and the last for long-time Hendrick Motorsports sponsor DuPont with Jeff Gordon, as DuPont was leaving the #24 team at the end of the season following a spinoff of its automotive coatings division to The Carlyle Group.

Report

Background
Homestead Miami Speedway is one of ten intermediate tracks to hold NASCAR races; the others are Atlanta Motor Speedway, Kansas Speedway, Chicagoland Speedway, Darlington Raceway, Texas Motor Speedway, New Hampshire Motor Speedway, Kentucky Speedway, Las Vegas Motor Speedway, and Charlotte Motor Speedway. The track's turns are banked from 18 to 20 degrees, while the front stretch, the location of the finish line, is banked at three degrees. The back stretch, opposite of the front, also has a three degree banking. The racetrack has seats for 65,000 spectators.

Heading into the final race of the season, Brad Keselowski was leading the Drivers' Championship with 2,371 points while Jimmie Johnson was second with 2,351 points, twenty points behind Keselowski. A maximum of 48 points were available for the final race. Behind Keselowski and Johnson in the Drivers' Championship, Kasey Kahne was third with 2,321 points, three points ahead of Clint Bowyer and twelve ahead of Denny Hamlin in fourth and fifth. Matt Kenseth with 2,297 was four points ahead of Greg Biffle, as Kevin Harvick with 2,285 points, was one point ahead of Tony Stewart and twenty-five ahead of Martin Truex Jr. Jeff Gordon and Dale Earnhardt Jr. was eleventh and twelfth with 2,256 and 2,211 points, respectively.

Chevrolet had already secured the Manufacturer's Championship, and entered the race on 240 points, thirty-three points ahead of Toyota with 203 points, with a maximum of nine points available at the Ford EcoBoost 400. Ford was third with 170 points, seventeen ahead of Dodge. Stewart was the race's defending winner, after his victory at the 2011 race.

References

Ford EcoBoost 400
Ford EcoBoost 400
Ford EcoBoost 400
NASCAR races at Homestead-Miami Speedway